Johannesburg East Commando was a light infantry regiment of the South African Army. It formed part of the South African Army Infantry Formation as well as the South African Territorial Reserve.

History

Origin
The Johannesburg East Defence Association was raised on 4 November 1924 under Government Gazette 24/1064 with its headquarters in Johan Rissik School in Troyeville.

Operations

With the UDF
By 1950 the association was renamed as the Johannesburg East Commando.

With the SADF
The unit resorted under the command of the SADF's Group 18.

During this era, the unit was mainly engaged in area force protection, search and cordons as well as other assistance to the local police. 

As an urban unit, this commando was also tasked with protecting strategic facilities as well as quelling township riots especially during the State of Emergency in the 1980s.

Commando to Regiment
In 1979 however the unit was renamed the Johannesburg South Commando and by 1983, the unit finally renamed again as the Johannesburg South Regiment.

The regiment developed into an urban counter insurgency unit, but was also involved in border duty. 

This was the only regiment under the command of Group 18 HQ.

With the SANDF

Disbandment
This unit, along with all other Commando units was disbanded after a decision by South African President Thabo Mbeki to disband all Commando Units. The Commando system was phased out between 2003 and 2008 "because of the role it played in the apartheid era", according to the Minister of Safety and Security Charles Nqakula.

Unit Insignia
The units symbol was a black stallion reminiscent of the horse commandos of the Boer armies. The gold background symbolised the gold mining industry of the area.

Leadership 
 Cmdt. Johannes Petrus Frederik Kirsten -1966
 Cmdt. Adriaan Jacobus Viljoen 1966 - 1976
 Cmdt G.J. Gees 1985-

References

See also 
 South African Commando System

Infantry regiments of South Africa
South African Commando Units
Disbanded military units and formations in Johannesburg